The FOGS Colts Challenge is an 11-team rugby league competition run by the QRL. It is the highest level of junior rugby league in Brisbane before players move into senior rugby. FOGS in an acronym for Former Origin Greats.

The competition provides the highest standard for young players ranging 16-18 who wish to further their rugby league careers and is seen as the first step for young Queensland boys in reaching the National Rugby League. Although the competition is based in Brisbane, scouts from all the NRL clubs have a presence in Colts rugby. Players are chosen from the FOGS Cup for U17, U18, state, and national representative sides, and it is also the stepping stone to play in the Queensland Cup. It is not unusual for young stars in the FOGS Cup to have already signed contracts with an NRL side.

History
The FOGS Colts Challenge, which ran from 1986 to 2017, only featured sides from south east Queensland. From 2008 to 2017, the National Rugby League (NRL) administered their own under-20 competition, the National Youth Competition, which featured the three Queensland-based NRL clubs, the Brisbane Broncos, Gold Coast Titans and North Queensland Cowboys, and a plethora of young players from the state. In 2016, the NRL announced that the National Youth Competition would be discontinued after the 2017 season, in favour of state-based under-20 competitions, administered by the Queensland Rugby League (QRL) and New South Wales Rugby League (NSWRL).

In 2017, in preparation for the new competition, the QRL ran a shortened, statewide under-20 competition called the FOGS U20s Cup. The competition, which was won by the Redcliffe Dolphins, ran over nine-weeks, alongside the Mal Meninga Cup, and featured all 15 teams who would eventually participate in the Hastings Deering Colts.

Current Teams

 Burleigh Bears 
 Easts Tigers 
 Ipswich Jets 
 Norths Devils 
 Redcliffe Dolphins 
 Souths Logan Magpies 
 Sunshine Coast Sea Eagles
 Tweed Heads Seagulls
 Toowoomba Clydesdales
 Wynnum-Manly Seagulls

2009 Ladder

Grand Final Results

See also

Rugby League Competitions in Australia

References

External links

 FOGS Colts U18s Home Page

Junior rugby league
Rugby league competitions in Queensland
Rugby league in Brisbane